Șerbănescu is a family name common in Romania.

Alexandru Șerbănescu, World War II flying ace
Horia Șerbănescu, music hall performer
Ilie Șerbănescu, economist
Theodor Șerbănescu, poet
Tia Șerbănescu, journalist and essayist

Others 
Şerbănescu is also the maiden name of Elena or Nina Iliescu, the wife of former President Ion Iliescu.

See also 
 Șerban (name)
 Șerbești (disambiguation)
 Șerbăneasa (disambiguation)
 Șerbănești (disambiguation)

Romanian-language surnames
Patronymic surnames